The North Carolina United States Senate election of 1968 was held on 5 November 1968 as part of the nationwide elections to the Senate.  The general election was fought between the Democratic incumbent Sam Ervin and the Republican nominee Robert Somers.  Ervin won re-election to a third full term, with over 60% of the vote. This was the last time any incumbent was re-elected in this seat until 2010. As of 2022, this is also the last time a Democrat was re-elected as a senator in North Carolina.

Primaries

Democratic primary
The first round of the 1968 North Carolina Primary Election was held on 4 May. The runoff for the Republican Party candidates took place on June 1.

Republican primary

Results

Footnotes

1968
North Carolina
1968 North Carolina elections